Muriel O. Ponsler Memorial State Scenic Viewpoint is a state park in the U.S. state of Oregon, administered by the Oregon Parks and Recreation Department.

The land was donated by J. C. Ponsler in memory of his wife Muriel.  She was born as Muriel Olevia Grant on September 21, 1897 in Dallas, Oregon.  She married J. C., a Florence, Oregon auto dealer in July 1920.  She died March 29, 1939 in Florence.

See also
 List of Oregon state parks

References

External links
 

State parks of Oregon
Parks in Lane County, Oregon
1938 establishments in Oregon